Milena Titoneli Guimarães (born 6 August 1998) is a Brazilian taekwondo fighter. She won the gold medal in the women's 67kg event at the 2019 Pan American Games in Lima, Peru and the 2021 Pan American Taekwondo Championships in Cancún, Mexico. She is also a two-time bronze medalist in this event at the World Taekwondo Championships (2019 and 2022).

Career 
Titoneli started fighting competitively in 2012, and two years later was in the 2014 Summer Youth Olympics.  She won a bronze medal in welterweight at the 2019 World Taekwondo Championships, after being defeated by Nur Tatar in the semifinal. She won a gold medal at the 2021 Pan American Taekwondo Championships.

Through the Pan American qualifier, Titoneli earned a spot to represent Brazil at the 2020 Summer Olympics. Titoneli won her first match against Julyana Al-Sadeq, and then lost the quarterfinals to eventual gold medalist Matea Jelić. Jelić's semifinal win sent Titoneli to the repechage, where after beating Lauren Lee, she reached the bronze dispute against Ivorian fighter Ruth Gbagbi, bronze medalist at the Rio 2016 Games. In spite of a balanced fight for most of the match, Titoneli lost and finished in 4th place.

She won one of the bronze medals in the women's welterweight event at the 2022 World Taekwondo Championships held in Guadalajara, Mexico.

References

External links

1998 births
Living people
Brazilian female taekwondo practitioners
Pan American Games medalists in taekwondo
Pan American Games gold medalists for Brazil
Taekwondo practitioners at the 2019 Pan American Games
Pan American Taekwondo Championships medalists
World Taekwondo Championships medalists
Medalists at the 2019 Pan American Games
Taekwondo practitioners at the 2020 Summer Olympics
Taekwondo practitioners at the 2014 Summer Youth Olympics
People from São Caetano do Sul
Sportspeople from São Paulo (state)
Olympic taekwondo practitioners of Brazil
Competitors at the 2022 South American Games
South American Games gold medalists for Brazil
South American Games medalists in taekwondo
21st-century Brazilian women